Morals for Men is a 1925 American silent drama film directed by Bernard H. Hyman and starring Conway Tearle, Agnes Ayres, and Alyce Mills. It is based upon the novel The Lucky Serum by Gouverneur Morris.

Plot
As described in a review in a film magazine, Joe (Tearle) and Bessie (Ayres), living in defiance of the moral code, have sank to the depths. Bessie, believing Joe has taken their meagre savings, leaves him and becomes a manicure, finally marrying a wealthy chap who turns out to be stingy and grouchy. Joe saves Marion (Mills), a rich girl, from drowning and eventually makes good as a civil engineer and marries her. Eventually Joe and Bessie meet and Joe, in helping her to keep her secret, incurs Marion's jealousy. Bessie is blackmailed by a former acquaintance and, in desperation, decides to tell everything to her husband, but to aid Joe she accuses Wallace (Miljan), with whom Marion is preparing to go away. Finally, Joe and Marion are reconciled, but Bessie learns that the world never forgives a woman who sins even when she has reformed, and she decides to end it all.

Cast

Preservation
A complete print of Morals for Men is in the collection of the Library of Congress.

References

Bibliography
 Robert B. Connelly. The Silents: Silent Feature Films, 1910-36, Volume 40, Issue 2. December Press, 1998.

External links

Lobby cards at silenthollywood.com

1925 films
1925 drama films
Silent American drama films
American silent feature films
1920s English-language films
Tiffany Pictures films
American black-and-white films
1920s American films